Marcel Hofrath (born 21 March 1993) is a German professional footballer who plays as a left-back or left midfielder for SGV Freiberg.

Club career
As a youth, he played for TV Grafenberg and Fortuna Düsseldorf.

On 31 January 2014, he moved from Fortuna Düsseldorf to Chemnitzer FC on a free transfer. In the 2015 winter transfer window, he joined SSV Jahn Regensburg. After being released from Regensburg, he joined SV Waldhof Mannheim.

References

External links
 
 
 

1993 births
Living people
Association football midfielders
German footballers
Fortuna Düsseldorf players
Chemnitzer FC players
SSV Jahn Regensburg players
SV Waldhof Mannheim players
SGV Freiberg players
2. Bundesliga players
3. Liga players
Regionalliga players
Oberliga (football) players
Footballers from Düsseldorf
21st-century German people